La Chorrera Airport  is an airport serving the town of La Chorrera in the Amazonas Department of Colombia.

Airlines and destinations

See also

Transport in Colombia
List of airports in Colombia

References

External links 
OpenStreetMap - La Chorrera
OurAirports - La Chorrera
FallingRain - La Chorrera Airport
HERE/Nokia - La Chorrera

Airports in Colombia
Buildings and structures in Amazonas Department